Model organism databases (MODs) are biological databases, or knowledgebases, dedicated to the provision of in-depth  biological data for intensively studied model organisms. MODs allow researchers to easily find background information on large sets of genes, plan experiments efficiently, combine their data with existing knowledge, and construct novel hypotheses. They allow users to analyse results and interpret datasets, and  the data they generate are increasingly used to describe less well studied species. Where possible, MODs share common approaches to collect and represent biological information. For example, all MODs use the Gene Ontology (GO) to describe functions, processes and cellular locations of specific gene products. Projects also exist to enable software sharing for curation, visualization and querying between different MODs. Organismal diversity and varying user requirements however mean that MODs are often required to customize capture, display, and provision of data.

Types of data and services

Model organism databases generate, source and collate species-specific information integratively by combining expert knowledge with literature curation and bioinformatics.

Services provided to biological research communities include: 
 Genome sequence annotations 
 Location of genes and regulatory regions in the genome
 Functional curation of gene products
 Discern functions fulfilled by the gene product by looking at a variety of data including Gene Ontology (GO) annotations, phenotypes, gene expression, pathway information
 Protein/RNA sequence annotations 
 Anatomical information
 Stock centres
 Orthology

List of model organism databases

References 

Biological databases
Model organism databases